Beaufort is a firm, raw cow's milk cheese associated with the gruyère family.  An Alpine cheese, it is produced in Beaufortain, Tarentaise valley and Maurienne, which are located in the Savoie region of the French Alps.

Varieties

There are three varieties of Beaufort:

Beaufort d'été (or summer Beaufort)
Beaufort d'alpage (made in chalets in the Alps on high pastures)
Beaufort d'hiver (winter Beaufort)

AOC Status

Beaufort was first certified as an appellation d'origine contrôlée in 1968.

Preparation and production

Beaufort is produced in the Beaufortain, Tarentaise and Maurienne valleys, as well as parts of the Val d'Arly valley, all located on 450,000 hectares of the Savoie region.

The cheese is prepared using  of milk for every  of cheese desired. The milk used in one variety comes from the Tarine or Abondance cows that graze in the Alps.

To make Beaufort, the milk is first heated and then cast into a beechwood hoop or mold which gives the cheese its distinctive concave shape. It is pressed for 24 hours, taken out of the hoops and then cooled for another 24 hours. Once cooled, it is soaked in brine and then stored on spruce shelves for one to two months. During this part of the process, one side of the cheese is hand-salted each morning, then turned over and massaged each afternoon. Once the cheese rind has reached a level of maturity, the cheese is smear-ripened with a mixture called morge which produces its strong flavour and pale yellow rind. The prepared cheese must then age for 6–12 months, or even longer, in a cool mountain cellar.

Taste and texture

Beaufort cheese is pale yellow, with a smooth and creamy texture and lacks holes like other Gruyère-style cheeses, Comté, Vacherin Fribourgeois or Emmental. Beaufort also has a very distinct aroma, sometime described as strong or mildly pungent and reminiscent of the pastures on which the Tarentaise and Abondance cows graze to provide the milk used for the cheese.

Beaufort is commonly used to make fondue because it melts easily. One of the many cheeses that go well with white wine, Beaufort is often enjoyed with fish, especially salmon.

See also

References

External links

Official website of the Syndicat de Défense du Fromage Beaufort (Beaufort Cheese Defence Union)

French cheeses
French products with protected designation of origin
Cow's-milk cheeses
Smear-ripened cheeses
Cheeses with designation of origin protected in the European Union